Die Roten Punkte (German for "The Red Dots") is a pop-music comedy duo composed of Australians Clare Bartholomew and Daniel Tobias, in the tradition of Spinal Tap and Flight of The Conchords. Like The White Stripes, the band members (Bartholomew and Tobias) claim to be a brother and sister, named Otto Rot and Astrid Rot, and they banter and sing in German accents of questionable authenticity.

The band has released four studio albums.

Band members
Astrid Rot – vocals, drums, glockenspiel, accordion 
Otto Rot – vocals, guitar, keytar, loops

Discography
 Die Roten Fahrten ("The Red Journeys", 2006)
 Super Musikant ("Super Musician", 2008)
 Kunst Rock (Art Rock) 2010
 Eurosmash! 2014

Songs
"Ich Bin Nicht Ein Roboter (I Am a Lion)" 
"Rock Bang!"
"Burger Store Dinosaur"
 "Bananenhaus (Banana House)"
 "Second Best Friend"
 "The Situation"
 "The 4:15 To Spandau Will Not Run Today"
 "Super Musikant (Super Musician)"
 "Straight Edge Girl"
 "Prince & Princess of Rock 'n' Roll"
 "It's Bad, It's Good"
 "Trying Not To Die"
 "Grunewald"
 "Automatic Door"
 "Rock 'n' Roll Monster"

References

External links
 

Australian rock music groups
Bands with fictional stage personas
Australian musical duos
Male–female musical duos
Rock music duos